Sheringham High School is a secondary school and sixth form located in the town of Sheringham in the English county of Norfolk. The school has around 700 students, usually including between 160 and 180 in the sixth form centre. It shares a campus with Sheringham Primary School and Sheringham Woodfields School. The headteacher is Alistair Ogle.

History
The school takes students from primary schools in Sheringham, Kelling and Holt. It has a specialism in the arts, and is a member of the Microsoft IT Academy programme.

On 1 November 2011 the school became an academy.

Curriculum
Virtually all maintained schools and academies follow the National Curriculum, and are inspected by Ofsted on how well they succeed in delivering a 'broad and balanced curriculum'. The school has to decide whether Key Stage 3 contains years 7, 8 and 9, or whether year 9 should be in Key Stage 4 and the students in that year just study subjects that will be examined by the GCSE exams at 16. Sheringham had decided to take the latter approach.
 
The timetable is planned a 50 period fortnight. 
Key Stage 3
In 2019,  Key Stage 3 students studied:

Key Stage 4
Students study a core curriculum with German or French, History or Geography and two optional subjects selected from a short list.

Ofsted Inspections
In 2012 Ofsted carried out an interim assessment of the school and confirmed the previous judgement of Good. In 2014 it was inspected again and judged Good.

Houses
Sheringham High School has four houses named after famous Norfolk people. Carter house named after adventurer Howard Carter, Cavell named after nurse Edith Cavell, Nelson after Lord Admiral Nelson and Sewell after author Anna Sewell.

Media coverage
In Spring 2009, Sheringham High School was featured in the Channel 4 series entitled "The Sex education show VS Pornography" hosted by Anna Richardson.

References

External links
 Sheringham High School website

High School
Secondary schools in Norfolk
Academies in Norfolk